Thomas Brine was a Scottish architect who worked on several projects in the Isle of Man in the 19th century.

His works included the Old House of Keys, the Herring Tower in Langness, The Courthouse in Kirk Michael and St Paul's, Ramsey.

References 

19th-century Scottish architects
Year of birth missing
Year of death missing
Buildings and structures in the Isle of Man